New Martinsville is a city in Wetzel County, West Virginia, United States, along the Ohio River. The population was 5,186 at the 2020 census. It is the county seat of Wetzel County.

Geography
New Martinsville is located at  (39.657465, -80.859504). Fishing Creek is located downstream nearby, just south of town.

History
The town was named after Presley Martin, an early settler.

Demographics

2010 census
As of the census of 2010, there were 5,366 people, 2,340 households, and 1,477 families living in the city. The racial makeup of the city was 98.2% White, 0.2% African American, 0.1% Native American, 0.6% Asian, 0.3% from other races, and 0.6% from two or more races. Hispanic or Latino of any race were 0.6% of the population.

There were 2,340 households, of which 25.7% had children under the age of 18 living with them, 46.8% were married couples living together, 12.1% had a female householder with no husband present, 4.2% had a male householder with no wife present, and 36.9% were non-families. 32.2% of all households were made up of individuals, and 15.1% had someone living alone who was 65 years of age or older. The average household size was 2.24 and the average family size was 2.78.

The median age in the city was 46.5 years. 20.5% of residents were under the age of 18; 6.1% were between the ages of 18 and 24; 20.9% were from 25 to 44; 30.6% were from 45 to 64; and 21.7% were 65 years of age or older. The gender makeup of the city was 47.2% male and 52.8% female.

2000 census
As of the census of 2000, there were 5,984 people, 2,484 households, and 1,684 families living in the city. The population density was 2,157.4 people per square mile (834.1/km2). There were 2,737 housing units at an average density of 986.8 per square mile (381.5/km2). The racial makeup of the city was 98.55% White, 0.05% African American, 0.10% Native American, 0.75% Asian, 0.03% Pacific Islander, 0.02% from other races, and 0.50% from two or more races. Hispanic or Latino of any race were 0.43% of the population.

There were 2,484 households, out of which 28.9% had children under the age of 18 living with them, 52.6% were married couples living together, 11.7% had a female householder with no husband present, and 32.2% were non-families. 28.9% of all households were made up of individuals, and 13.4% had someone living alone who was 65 years of age or older. The average household size was 2.34 and the average family size was 2.86.

In the city, the population was spread out, with 22.9% under the age of 18, 6.7% from 18 to 24, 25.4% from 25 to 44, 26.8% from 45 to 64, and 18.2% who were 65 years of age or older. The median age was 42 years. For every 100 females, there were 88.2 males. For every 100 females age 18 and over, there were 81.5 males.

The median income for a household in the city was $33,750, and the median income for a family was $40,851. Males had a median income of $37,614 versus $21,019 for females. The per capita income for the city was $18,578. About 16.9% of families and 20.6% of the population were below the poverty line, including 29.4% of those under age 18 and 15.1% of those age 65 or over.

Political officials

Mayor: Sandy Hunt
1st Ward Councilman:  Jeff Gieseke
2nd Ward Councilman:  Joey Smith
3rd Ward Councilman:  Ron Brill
4th Ward Councilman:  Steve Pallisco
5th Ward Councilman:  Joel Potts
6th Ward Councilman:  Iris (Deaner) Isaacs

Climate
The climate in this area is characterized by relatively high temperatures and evenly distributed precipitation throughout the year.  According to the Köppen Climate Classification system, New Martinsville has a Humid subtropical climate, abbreviated "Cfa" on climate maps.

Notable people
 Chris Booker, entertainment personality
 John Callaway, journalist
 John Murtha, Democratic Party member of the United States House of Representatives. He grew up in Pennsylvania and represented the twelfth district of that state
 Bill Stewart, former head football coach at West Virginia

See also

 List of cities in West Virginia
 List of cities and towns along the Ohio River
 Lewis Wetzel
 New Martinsville Bridge
 Magnolia High School
 Stage Struck (1925) movie made in New Martinsville with Gloria Swanson

References

External links

 Detailed City Data from www.city-data.com

Cities in West Virginia
Cities in Wetzel County, West Virginia
County seats in West Virginia
West Virginia populated places on the Ohio River